Dimitra Papadopoulou (born 1962) is a Greek Cypriot actress, writer and director. 

Papadopoulou gained national recognition for portraying Dimitra on the popular television sitcom Oi Aparadektoi (1991-1993) which she also wrote . She has written many theatrical plays such as O papous exei piesi (Greek: Ο παππους εχει πιεση, English: The grandfather has high blood pressure) and Mana tha pao sto Hollywood (Greek: Μανα θα παω στο Χολυγουντ, English: Mom I'm going to Hollywood). In recent years she has made few appearances on TV as she has focused mostly on theatre.

Early life 
Dimitra was born in Alexandria,Egypt. Both of her parents are of Cypriot descent. She lived in Alexandria till the age of seven and later she moved with her parents to Cyprus and then to Greece, first to Thessaloniki and then to Athens.

Filmography

Film

Television

References

1957 births
Living people
Greek actresses
Greek writers
Greek women writers
Greek screenwriters
People from Alexandria